Hongshan Arena is an indoor sporting arena located in Ürümqi, Xinjiang, China. The capacity of the arena is 3,800 spectators and opened in 2002.  It hosts indoor sporting events such as basketball and volleyball. It hosts the Xinjiang Flying Tigers of the Chinese Basketball Association.

See also
 Sport in China

References

Indoor arenas in China
Xinjiang Flying Tigers
Buildings and structures in Ürümqi
Sports venues in Xinjiang